This article lists the diplomatic missions in Solomon Islands. The capital Honiara currently hosts only seven embassies. Several other countries are represented by either their embassies in Canberra or Port Moresby.

Embassies/High Commissions in Honiara

Other posts in Honiara

Non-Resident Embassies and High Commissions
Resident in Canberra, unless otherwise noted.

 

 (Jakarta)

 (Singapore)

 (Port Moresby)

 (Port Moresby)

 (Tokyo)

 (New York City)
 (Beijing)
 (Port Moresby)
 (Tokyo)
 (Port Moresby)
 (Port Moresby)

 (Jerusalem)

 (Tokyo)
 (Tokyo)

 (Tokyo)
 (Kuala Lumpur)
 (Port Moresby)

 (Valletta)

 (Wellington)

 (Port Moresby)
 

 (Beijing)
 (Port Moresby)

  
 (Port Moresby)

 (Stockholm)
 
 (Kuala Lumpur)

  
 (Tokyo)

 (Tokyo)
  

  
  
 (Tokyo)
 (Tokyo)

Former Embassies
 (Closed 2019)

See also
Foreign relations of Solomon Islands
List of diplomatic missions of Solomon Islands

References

 Ministry of Foreign Affairs and External Trade of Solomon Islands

Solomon Islands
Foreign relations of the Solomon Islands
Diplomatic missions